Lubicz (Luba, Lubow, Łuba) is a Polish nobility coat of arms.

History

Year of creation around 1190, known from the seal from 1348. The river called Drwęca bore the name Lubicz in the earlier times. Above that river in 1190 there was a battle between the Mazovian knights and Prussia. For bravery and special battle merits, one of the knights of the Pobóg coat of arms was given the own coat of arms called by the river - Lubicz. Hence the coat of arms of Lubicz is the successor of the Pobóg coat of arms.

Blazon
Azure, a horseshoe argent, heels to base, surmounted of a cross patée, and a second within the heels, both silver.

Notable bearers
Notable bearers of this Coat of Arms include:
 House of Wróblewski
 Jerzy Wróblewski
 Andrzej Wróblewski
 Władysław Wróblewski
 Zygmunt Florenty Wróblewski
 House of Żółkiewski
 Stanisław Żółkiewski
 Gruszecki family
 Agafya Grushetskaya -  Tsaritsa of Russia
 Martin Zaniewski of turkish oil wrestling fame
 Adam Adamandy Kochański
 Stanisław Kostka Choromański
 Jan Grochowski
 Franz Golovatch (Hołowacz)
 Kazimierz Bronisz Chromiński
 Stanisław Moniuszko (Krzywda coat of arms)
 Oscar Milosz (Oscar Vladislas de Lubicz-Milosz)
 Czesław Miłosz
 Ściapan Niekraševič
 Nikolai Gogol
 Zygmunt Lubicz Zaleski
 Tadeusz Wladyslaw Konopka (stage name Ted Knight)
 Witold Lesiewicz
 Elżbieta Szydłowska
 House of Wojtowicz

Gallery

Related Coat of Arms
 Krzywda Coat of Arms
 Pobóg Coat of Arms

See also
 Polish heraldry
 Heraldic family
 List of Polish nobility coats of arms
 House of Wojtowicz

References

External links 
  Lubicz Coat of Arms, the altered ones and the bearers.

Bibliography
 Tadeusz Gajl: Herbarz polski od średniowiecza do XX wieku : ponad 4500 herbów szlacheckich 37 tysięcy nazwisk 55 tysięcy rodów. L&L, 2007. .
 Encyklopedia Multimedialna PWN, cz. 4. Historia
 Sławomir Górzyński, Jerzy Kochanowski Herby szlachty polskiej, Warszawa 1990, s. 96–98

Lubicz